Mateja Svet; born 16 August 1968) is a Slovenian former alpine skier, who competed for Yugoslavia from 1984 to 1990.

Biography
Svet was born in Ljubljana, Socialist Republic of Slovenia, Yugoslavia. Making her first appearance in the 1983/1984 season, she won the first Yugoslav female skiing victory in February 1986.

Svet won the World Cup giant slalom title in the 1987/1988 season, won silver medal in giant slalom in the 1988 Winter Olympics in Calgary, won three medals in 1987 World Championship in Crans-Montana (bronze in slalom and super G, silver in giant slalom) and two medals in 1989 World Championship in Vail – gold in slalom, later when the bronze Christelle Guignard was disqualified due to doping, also bronze in giant slalom. In her rather short career – she quit at the age of 21 due to disagreements with the Ski Association of Yugoslavia – she achieved seven World cup victories, 22 World Cup podiums and 54 World Cup top tens. From 1985 until 1990 she qualified no lower than 7th in the overall World Cup standings.

World Cup results

Season titles

Season standings

Race podiums
 7 wins (6 GS, 1 SL)
 22 podiums (14 GS, 5 SL, 3 SG)

Olympic Games results

World Championships results

References

External links
 
 

1968 births
Living people
Skiers from Ljubljana
Slovenian female alpine skiers
Alpine skiers at the 1984 Winter Olympics
Alpine skiers at the 1988 Winter Olympics
Olympic alpine skiers of Yugoslavia
Olympic medalists in alpine skiing
Olympic silver medalists for Yugoslavia
Yugoslav female alpine skiers
FIS Alpine Ski World Cup champions
Medalists at the 1988 Winter Olympics